Masada al-Mujahideen (Arabic: مسعدة المجاهدين) is a Palestinian terrorist organization associated with Al-Qaeda inside the Gaza Strip.

History 
The group first came into prominence after releasing a video online showing the group dropping a bomb on the Israeli city of Sderot, This prompted Israeli Air Force to do airstrikes against Masada al-Mujahideen in the Gaza Strip. After starting clashes with Israeli Defense Forces, another Jihadist organization in the Gaza strip named Jaysh al-Ummah, also known as Army of the Ummah, started clashes with Masada al-Mujahideen after they disapproved of the works done by the organization. Later that year, Masada al-Mujahideen creates a media-wing for propaganda called Riah, it mostly operated on Google+ until the account was taken down, which then the group would move to Facebook. It would create eulogies for Osama bin Laden, Attiya Allah, and Abu Yahya al-Libi.

Attacks in Israel 
Masada al-Mujahideen, a couple months after the bomb attack, would threaten with more "operations" in Israel, later that day, they would claim responsibility a train fire that happened at night in Haifa. A couple days later, they claim responsibility for a cargo ship fire in Eilat, Israel. In July 2011, they would claim responsibility for a forest fire that happened in Jerusalem, again in July they would claim responsibility for the Alfei Menashe Fire. In October 2011, Masada al-Mujahideen would claim responsibility for multiple arson attacks that have happened in Israel. In November 2011, Masada al-Mujahideen would claim responsibility for a arson attack on a chemical factory owned by the Israeli government, then in December, they would claim responsibility for a industrial center arson attack. In 2012 they claimed responsibility for an arson attack in Be'er Ya'akov. In that year, they would also set a military base on fire in Ashkelon, owned by the Israel Defense Forces, and claim responsibility, later that month, they would claim responsibility an arson attack on a airplane factory in Haifa, they would also later that month, again in Haifa, claim responsibility for a residential fire that happened. Again in May 2012, in Northern Israel, they would claim a series of different fires and arson attacks, including some in the occupied region of the Golan Heights. Masada would also, the next day, claim responsibility for fire attacks targeting IDF guards.

Attacks in Palestine and at Hamas 
A month after the cargo ship fire, Masada al-Mujahideen would attack the Palestinian Liberation Organization's soldiers after Palestine would start land negotiations with Israel. Masada al-Mujahideen would start doing light attacks on Hamas for the treatment of their POWs and regular prisoners. In 2012, Masada al-Mujahideen blamed Hamas for the death of the Salafi Jihadist leader, Abu al-Walid al-Maqdisi, and threatened to attack Hamas, which they would later do so.

Arizona wild fires and Nevada forest fires 
In 2012, Masada al-Mujahideen attempted to claim responsibility for the Nevada forest fires, until their claim was disproved.

In 2013, during one of Arizona's wild fires, Masada al-Mujahideen claimed responsibility with the statement "Masada al-Mujahideen Fulfilled its Promise and Attacked America Again After the Expiration of the Period with Fires that Achieved Historic Results", they would also celebrate the death of 19 firefighters attempting to put out the wild fire, but Arizona local governments would reject the claim done by the organization.

References 

Terrorism in Israel
2008 establishments in Israel
Anti-Zionist organizations
Jihadist groups
Salafi Jihadist groups
2013 disestablishments in Israel